Farida Feza Ndaya (born 8 January 1999), known as Farida Feza, is a DR Congolese footballer who plays as a midfielder for the DR Congo women's national team.

International career
Feza capped for the DR Congo at senior level during the 2020 UNNIFAC Women's Cup.

International goals
Scores and results list DR Congo's goal tally first

See also
 List of Democratic Republic of the Congo women's international footballers

References

External links

1999 births
Living people
Democratic Republic of the Congo women's footballers
Women's association football midfielders
Democratic Republic of the Congo women's international footballers
21st-century Democratic Republic of the Congo people